Heiðrún or Heidrun is a goat in Norse mythology, who consumes the foliage of the tree Læraðr and produces mead for the einherjar. She is described in the Poetic Edda and Prose Edda.

Prose Edda

Poetic Edda
In the Poetic Edda Heiðrún is mentioned twice. She is described in the Grímnismál in a way similar to Snorri's description.

Since Snorri quotes other strophes of Grímnismál it seems reasonable to assume that he knew this strophe too and used it as his source for his description of Heiðrún.

In the Hyndluljóð the giantess Hyndla (lit. bitch/she-dog) used the term "Heiðrún" to insult the goddess Freyja. Thorpe and some other translators translated the name straight to "she-goat".

Etymology
The etymology of Heiðrún remains debatable. Anatoly Liberman suggests that Heiðþyrnir, the name of the lowest heaven in Scandinavian mythology (from heið "bright sky"), was cut into two, and on the basis of those halves the names the heavenly goat Heiðrún and of the heavenly stag Eikþyrnir were formed (the element rún ~ run concealed several puns, but it is a common suffix of female names). The etymology of the New High German name Heidrun is also debatable.

Heiðrún's name is sometimes anglicized Heidrun, Heidhrun, Heithrun, Heidrún, Heithrún or Heidhrún.

In Popular Culture 

 Heidrun is a song by Amon Amarth, a Swedish melodic death metal band, about the goat Heiðrún.

See also
 Auðumbla, a primeval cow in Norse mythology whose udders produce four rivers of milk, from which Ymir fed
 List of people named Heidrun

Bibliography
 Bellows, Henry Adams. Translation of the Poetic Edda.
 Eysteinn Björnsson (ed.) (2005). Snorra-Edda: Formáli & Gylfaginning : Textar fjögurra meginhandrita.
 Hollander, Lee M. (1962). The Poetic Edda. Austin: University of Texas. .
 Jón Helgason (Ed.). (1955). Eddadigte (3 vols.). Copenhagen: Munksgaard. 
 Liberman, Anatoly (2016). In Prayer and Laughter. Essays on Medieval Scandinavian and Germanic Mythology, Literature, and Culture. Paleograph Press. .
 Young, Jean I. (1964). Snorri Sturluson : the Prose Edda. Berkeley: University of California Press. .

References

Creatures in Norse mythology
Mythological caprids